The 1987 Sovran Bank D.C. National Tennis Classic was a men's tennis tournament and was played on outdoor hard courts. The surface was changed from clay to hard court in an attempt to attract more top players in preparation for the US Open. It was the 19th edition of the tournament, which was part of the 1987 Grand Prix circuit, and was held at the Rock Creek Stadium in Washington, D.C. from July 27 through August 2, 1987. First-seeded Ivan Lendl won the singles title and earned $39,440 first-prize money.

Finals

Singles

 Ivan Lendl defeated  Brad Gilbert 6–1, 6–0
 It was Lendl's 3rd singles title of the year and his 65th of his career.

Doubles

 Gary Donnelly /  Peter Fleming defeated  Laurie Warder /  Blaine Willenborg 6–2, 7–6

References

External links
 ATP tournament profile
 ITF tournament edition details

Washington Open (tennis)
Washington Star International
Washington Star International
Washington Star International